Stayce D. Harris (born 1959) is a retired United States Air Force Lieutenant General who last served as the Inspector General of the Air Force. Harris previously served as the Assistant Vice Chief of Staff and Director, Air Staff, Headquarters, United States Air Force. She also served as Deputy Chairman of the Air Force Council, and was the Air Force accreditation official for the international Corps of Air Attachés. Harris' promotion to Lieutenant General was a first for African-American females, as she is the first to hold the three-star rank in the U.S. Air Force. Additionally, she is the first Air Force Reservist to be promoted to the three-star rank other than the Commander, Air Force Reserve Command. Prior to her assignment as Assistant Vice Chief of Staff, Harris was Commander, Twenty-Second Air Force.

Harris received her commission in 1981 through Air Force ROTC at the University of Southern California serving on active duty until transferring to the Air Force Reserve in 1991. While in the reserves Harris has served as in Individual Mobilization Augmentee in multiple staff assignments. She has also commanded the 459th Air Refueling Wing,
494th Air Expeditionary Group, and 729th Airlift Squadron. Harris is a Command Pilot having flown more than 2,500 hours in military aircraft. Those aircraft include the C-130H, KC-135R, C-141B/C, T-38, and T-37.

Awards and decorations

Professional Memberships and Associations
Air Force Association
Reserve Officers Association
Airlift/Tanker Association
Air Force Sergeants Association
Tuskegee Airmen Inc.
Women Military Aviators
American Legion

Dates of promotion
Second Lieutenant February 13, 1982
First Lieutenant February 13, 1984
Captain February 13, 1986
Major March 5, 1993
Lieutenant Colonel September 18, 1998
Colonel April 1, 2002  
Brigadier General April 2, 2009 
Major General December 20, 2013 
Lieutenant General August 19, 2016

See also
 List of female United States military generals and flag officers
 List of African-America United States military generals and flag officers

References

External links

African-American female military personnel
Female generals of the United States Air Force
Living people
Recipients of the Defense Superior Service Medal
Recipients of the Legion of Merit
University of Southern California alumni
African-American women aviators
American women aviators
African-American aviators
1959 births
21st-century African-American people
21st-century African-American women
20th-century African-American people
20th-century African-American women
African-American United States Air Force personnel